The Ga'aton Stream (Nahal HaGa'aton) is a small river in the Northern District of Israel. It passes through the town of Nahariya before emptying into the Mediterranean Sea. The river runs through the main street of Nahariya, a city that takes its name from the river (nahar means river in Hebrew).

History
In Ottoman times, the river was known as Nahr Mefshukh.

The source of this river, formerly known as "the fountain-head of the waters of Ǧiyāto", and which issued from two natural springs: ʻain a-tinah and  ʻain al-ʻanqalit, is mentioned in late 2nd century rabbinic writings (Sifrei on Deuteronomy 11:24), and in the Mosaic of Rehob.

See also
Geography of Israel

References

Rivers of Israel
Galilee
Nahariya